Jazeman Firhan bin Jaafar (born 13 November 1992) is a Malaysian racing driver.

Career

Karting
Jazeman started his career at a tender age of 6 in Shah Alam, Malaysia. A hobby which turned to a full time career, Jazeman has won a total Eleven Karting Championships in Malaysia, Asia and also won the Belgian Open Kart Championship Race in Mariembourg.

Formula Renault
In 2006, Jazeman competed in Asian Formula Renault 2.0 for the Macanese outfit Asia Racing Team at a young age of 13. He was the youngest ever driver to be granted with an International C Licence from the Fédération Internationale de l'Automobile (FIA). He finished third in the championship, behind champion Pekka Saarinen, taking four podiums during the season.

Formula BMW
In 2007, Jazeman competed in Formula BMW Asia. Jazeman was again given a special allowance to gain an International C License from the Fédération Internationale de l'Automobile (FIA) to compete in the series when he was fourteen. Jazeman won the championship but not before the following February due to the appeal of a technical infringement.

After Round 22, and following the receipt of a post-race scrutineering report, Race Stewards issued a Decision to exclude the cars of Jazeman and team-mate Jack Lemvard for a technical infringement of the regulations. In view of the severity of the offence and the fact that the same team had contravened the technical regulations on an earlier occasion during the season, the decision also included the exclusion of CIMB Team Qi-Meritus from the 2007 championship. The decision put Jazeman second in the drivers' classification at the end of the season, just one point behind Zahir Ali. Meritus submitted an official appeal on the disqualification of their drivers in the race and their exclusion from the team championship.

The Federation Automobile of Sport China confirmed that they received the letter of appeal from the team dated 5 November 2007. Team Qi-Meritus learned that the appeals lodged with FASC against the decisions of the stewards at Zhuhai were overturned in favour of the drivers and team. The decision meant that Jazeman was handed back the drivers' title and Qi-Meritus also won the constructors' trophy. Jazeman became the youngest ever winner in the history of Formula BMW at 14 years old. 

Jazeman contested two seasons in Formula BMW Europe in seasons 2008 and 2009, driving for Holzer Rennsport and Eifelland Racing respectively; finishing fourteenth and ninth in the two seasons.

Formula Three
Jazeman moved into the British Formula 3 Championship, starting with the 2010 season and driving for Carlin.

In 2012, Jazeman finished second in the overall drivers' championship in the British F3 International Series and also being the First Asian to win the Grand Prix de Pau. He crossed the line in third place at the final round in Donnington Park race weekend to seal the runner-up spot with 306 points. Jazeman is setting his sights on either the World Series by Renault or the GP2 Series in 2013 as the natural career progression after achieving his best overall placing in the British F3 championship.

Formula Renault 3.5
Jazeman stepped up to Formula Renault 3.5 with Carlin for the 2013 season. In his 3 seasons of Formula Renault 3.5, he collected a total of 1 Pole Position, 7 Podiums and became the Winner of the Monaco Grand Prix with Fortec. He drove for the Czech based ISR Racing and English, Fortec Motorsports respectively.

Racing record

Career summary

 As Jazeman was a guest driver, he was ineligible for points.

Complete Formula Renault 3.5 Series results
(key) (Races in bold indicate pole position) (Races in italics indicate fastest lap)

Complete Blancpain GT Series Sprint Cup results

Complete FIA World Endurance Championship results
(key) (Races in bold indicate pole position; races in italics indicate fastest lap)

24 Hours of Le Mans results

Complete European Le Mans Series results
(key) (Races in bold indicate pole position; results in italics indicate fastest lap)

† As Jaafar was a guest driver, he was ineligible to score points.

Personal life
Jazeman resides in Malaysia and his hobbies are training and reading,
while his idol is Ayrton Senna.

In September 2012, Jazeman was confirmed as a new member of the British Racing Drivers’ Club (BRDC) Rising Star programme, following an invitation from the Club. The BRDC Rising Stars programme aims to assist the very best British and Commonwealth drivers achieve their goal of success in top level motorsport. Jazeman, the first Malaysian driver to be a BRDC Rising Star, carried the unique BRDC Rising Stars ‘blue roundel’ on his race suit and race car, represented the BRDC as he raced and as part of the scheme and was the first Asian ‘Junior Member’ of the BRDC, which he received the privileges enjoyed by full members of the Club. Moving forward to 2014, The BRDC awarded Jazeman a Full Membership. The BRDC is, arguably, the most exclusive club in motor racing. With a membership of only 850, home to the most successful racing drivers from Great Britain and the Commonwealth, who have met the exacting entry criteria and achieved at the highest levels of the sport. Membership of the BRDC is highly sought after and difficult to achieve and the list of Members, past and present, reads like a ‘Who’s Who’ of motorsport.

With the successful season in 2016 with Jazeman crowned as Vice Champion in the Blancpain Endurance Series, He was awarded as SIC-MAM International Racing Driver of the Year Award.

In 2017, The establishment of the Johor State Road Safety Council shows the seriousness of the government in collaborating with the private sector in reducing the rate of road accidents in Johor. The target of the State Government is to reduce mortality rate due to road accidents and to raise awareness to the younger generation about the importance of road safety. In an effort to raise awareness on road safety, Jazeman was appointed as the Council's Vice Chairman with having had various road safety programs implemented in selected districts to attract more interest for the younger generation to follow all road safety programs in order to safeguard road safety in the eyes of the younger generation.

Jazeman created history and was crowned as SIC-MAM Petronas International Racing Driver of the Year Award for the second time and was also awarded as Malaysia's Motorsports Hall of Fame presented by the then Prime Minister, Tun Dr. Mahathir Mohamad after his successful campaign in the World Endurance Championship.

In March 2019, Jazeman has been placed as an Executive Director of the Board of Sepang International Circuit (SIC) by The Youth and Sports Ministry of Malaysia. SIC was looking to further enhance its expansion with its Development and Nurturing future generation of young Malaysian talents. Jazeman is only in his mid 20s and has already over 20 years of Motorsports Experience, which the Malaysian Government saw as a perfect fit for the role.

References

External links
 
 

1992 births
Living people
Sportspeople from Kuala Lumpur
Malaysian people of Malay descent
Malaysian racing drivers
Formula BMW Europe drivers
Formula BMW Pacific drivers
British Formula Three Championship drivers
Formula 3 Euro Series drivers
FIA Formula 3 European Championship drivers
World Series Formula V8 3.5 drivers
Blancpain Endurance Series drivers
24 Hours of Le Mans drivers
24 Hours of Spa drivers
GP3 Series drivers
FIA World Endurance Championship drivers
Carlin racing drivers
Asian Le Mans Series drivers
European Le Mans Series drivers
Double R Racing drivers
ISR Racing drivers
Fortec Motorsport drivers
Strakka Racing drivers
Jota Sport drivers
Eifelland Racing drivers
Asia Racing Team drivers
Asian Formula Renault Challenge drivers
Formula BMW Asia drivers
Team Meritus drivers
Mercedes-AMG Motorsport drivers
TOM'S drivers
McLaren Racing drivers
24H Series drivers